Kentucky Route 131 (KY 131) is a  long state highway in Kentucky that runs from Kentucky Route 58  northeast of Mayfield to U.S. Route 62 in Reidland via Smysonia and Reidland.

Major intersections

References

0131
Kentucky Route 131
Kentucky Route 131